Unión Local Andina Fútbol Club, usually known as Universidad de Los Andes, or by the acronym ULA, is a Venezuelan football club based in Mérida.

History

The club was founded on February 28, 1977, as Universidad de Los Andes Mérida Fútbol Club.

Titles

Primera División: 2
1983, 1990–91

Segunda División: 2
1986, 1994–95

Copa Venezuela: 1
1995-96

Performance in CONMEBOL competitions
Copa Libertadores: 3 appearances
1984: Semi-Finals
1992: First Round
 :

Copa Libertadores

Universidad de Los Andes disputed Copa Libertadores de América three times.

In 1984, in the first stage, the club was in the same group of Portuguesa, of Venezuela, and two Peruvian teams, Sporting Cristal, and Melgar. The club finished in the first position, together with Sporting Cristal. A first place playoff was played, and ULA won 2–1. In the second stage, the club was in the same group of two Brazilian clubs, Flamengo, and Grêmio, and was eliminated after finishing in the last position .

In 1992, the club was, in the first stage, in the same group of S.C. Marítimo, of Venezuela, and Barcelona and Valdez, of Ecuador. ULA and Marítimo finished in the third position, so, a third place playoff was played. Marítimo won 1–0, and Universidad de Los Andes was eliminated .

In 1999, ULA disputed the preliminary stage of the competition, with  Estudiantes de Mérida, of Venezuela, and Necaxa and Monterrey, of Mexico. The club was eliminated after finishing in the last position .

Stadium

ULA's home stadium is Estadio Guillermo Soto Rosa, which has a maximum capacity of 15,000 people.

Colors

The club's colors are blue and white.

References

 RSSSF
 RSSSF
 RSSSF

External links
Club info

Association football clubs established in 1977
Football clubs in Venezuela
University and college association football clubs
1977 establishments in Venezuela